You Suck Crap is the debut studio album of Babyland, released in 1992 by Flipside Records.

Reception

Ned Raggett of AllMusic describes the album as "frenetic, outraged experimental techno-industrialized hardcore." The critic went on to note the band for "having made its reputation as a killer live-act playing self-described "electronic junk punk," translating that energy to CD inevitably lost the visual power of the band—the amount of metal cans, drums, and instrumentation the two normally work with is a sight to behold, as is Dan's totally in-your-face, anguished singing—but Crap still made a more-than-fine document of the duo's early sound. I Die:You Die said "You Suck Crap occupies its own space outside of the genres it borrows from, which is perhaps why their “electronic junk punk” label continues to resonate" and "what makes it even more applicable is the consistency with which Smith and Gatto approach their distinct style, even while seemingly deviating from it."

Track listing

Personnel 
Adapted from the You Suck Crap liner notes.

Babyland
 Dan Gatto – lead vocals, keyboards
 Michael Smith – percussion

Production and design
 Rusty Cusick – recording (1, 4, 7, 10, 13, 16)
 Doug Green – recording (3, 5, 8, 9, 12, 15)
 Don Lewis – cover art, photography
 Stoker – recording (2, 6, 11, 14)

Release history

References

External links 
 
 You Suck Crap at iTunes

1992 debut albums
Babyland albums
Flipside (fanzine) albums